The 1998 Speedway Grand Prix was the 53rd edition of the official World Championship. It was the fourth season in the Speedway Grand Prix era used to determine the Speedway World Champion.

Tony Rickardsson won the World title, which included three wins from the six Grand Prix events. The Swede's win was his second World title success and he secured the gold medal comfortably ahead of nearest rivals Jimmy Nilsen and Tomasz Gollob.

Event format 

The system used was a new one for the 4th SGP season with 24 riders, divided into two classes. The eight best would be directly qualified for the "Main Event", while the sixteen others would be knocked out if they finished out of the top two in 4-man heats on two occasions - while they would go through if they finished inside the top two on two occasions. This resulted in 10 heats, where eight proceeded to the Main Event, where exactly the same system was applied to give eight riders to a semi-final.

The semi-finals were then two heats of four, where the top two qualified for a final and the last two going towards the consolation final. The 4 finalists scored 25, 20, 18 and 16 points, with 5th to 8th scoring 15, 14, 12 and 10 point, and after that 8, 8, 7, 7, etc. Places after 8th place were awarded according to the time a rider was knocked out and, secondly, according to position in the last heat he rode in.

Qualification for Grand Prix 

The 1998 season had 21 permanent riders and 3 wild card at each event. The permanent riders are highlighted in the results table below.

Calendar

Final standings

References

External links 
 Official Speedway GP site

 
1998
World I